Aguas frescas are light non-alcoholic beverages made from one or more fruits, cereals, flowers, or seeds blended with sugar and water. They are popular in Mexico and some other Latin American countries, as well as parts of the United States such as the Southwest.

Aguas frescas are sold by street vendors and are commonly found in convenience stores, restaurants and juice bars.

Terminology
The terms aguas frescas could lead to confusion in some Spanish speaking countries, as they may refer to bottled soft drinks. For example, in Costa Rica, Guatemala, Honduras, Nicaragua, and Panamá soft drinks are referred to as "frescos" (short for refresco), which in Mexico means soft drinks. Soft drinks in Guatemala are called "aguas", short for aguas gaseosas, which could easily be confused with the Mexican aguas frescas.

Types
In Mexico, it is common to find aguas frescas in these flavors:

See also
Licuados
Paletas
Samalamig

References

 
Non-alcoholic drinks
Mexican drinks
Spanish language